Real America with Jorge Ramos is an American news program hosted by Jorge Ramos that premiered on Univision on November 21, 2017.

It later had a premiere on Facebook Watch on September 6, 2018.

Format
Real America with Jorge Ramos follows Ramos as he "travels the country to talk to immigrants of diverse backgrounds and situations, delivering a rarely covered view of today’s America from their perspective."

Production
On February 12, 2018, it was announced that Facebook was developing a news section within its streaming service Facebook Watch  to feature breaking news stories. The news section was set to be overseen by Facebook's head of news partnerships Campbell Brown.

On June 6, 2018, it was announced that Facebook's first slate of partners for their news section on Facebook Watch would include Univision. The news program the two companies developed was revealed to be hosted by Jorge Ramos and titled Real America with Jorge Ramos.

As of 2022, the last episodes aired in 2021 on Univision.

References

External links

Real America with Jorge Ramos on Univision

Facebook Watch original programming
2010s American television news shows
2018 American television series debuts
2019 American television series endings